Opal is an unincorporated community in Lawrence County, in the U.S. state of Missouri.

Opal is located on Missouri Route 39-Missouri Route 265 about midway between Mount Vernon to the northwest and Aurora to the southeast.

The community most likely has the first name of a local woman.

References

Unincorporated communities in Lawrence County, Missouri
Unincorporated communities in Missouri